Simon King is a stand-up comedian currently active in the United States with appearances in Canada, appearing on Comedy Network and Comedy Central, as well as various comedy clubs and fests in the United States, such as the HBO U.S. Comedy Arts Festival, the San Francisco International Comedy Competition, and the Seattle International Comedy Competition.  King has four releases, all copyrighted by Comedy Here Often?, a comedy club in Vancouver, BC, Canada. His album Unfamous (2010), was his first album, followed by Furious (2016), a single, Lonely People (2018) and As Good As Or Better Than (2022), his latest album. King played Dave in Tooth Fairy (2010), a movie starring Dwayne "The Rock" Johnson. King was also a warm-up stage comedian for Little Brother of War (2010), and played a "portly student" in The Triple Eight (2008-present).

Life and career

Simon King was born into an entertainment family that relocated to British Columbia, Canada from the South of England when he was young. He is a voice actor and writer as well as a stand-up comedian.

King has been featured at many comedy festivals including: The Just For Laughs Festival; The Vancouver International Comedy Festival; The TBS Las Vegas Comedy Festival; The Winnipeg Comedy Festival; and The HBO U.S. Comedy Arts Festival in Aspen, Colorado. In addition to film and television credits, in 2008, The Comedy Network and CTV filmed a one-hour special starring him for the popular series Comedy Now! In early 2013, King recorded a second hour-and-a-half long special for the No Kidding series on the Toronto-based IChannel.

King has released multiple albums and specials, both with labels and independently including: FURIOUS (Special 2016), One For The Money (Album 2018), Two For The Show (Album 2019) and As Good As Or Better Than (Special/Album 2022) directed by Rory Scovel.

King currently resides in Vancouver, Canada after having lived in Los Angeles, California and London, England.

Notes

External links

Simon King's official website

Simon King's Facebook fan page
Simon King's YouTube channel
Simon King's Twitter

English male comedians
Living people
Canadian male comedians
Comedians from London
Comedians from Vancouver
Year of birth missing (living people)
Canadian stand-up comedians